Rilly-la-Montagne is one of the Communes of the Marne department in north-eastern France. The railway tunnel in the area was used as a World War II V-1 flying bomb storage depot. Rilly-la-Montagne station has rail connections to Reims and Épernay.

See also
Montagne de Reims Regional Natural Park

References

External links

Football Club Rilly la Montagne

Rillylamontagne
V-weapon subterranea